Xing Yu, also known as Shi Xingyu or Shi Yanneng is a Chinese martial artist and actor, who was one of the 32nd generation Shaolin monks.

Biography
Xing Yu was born on December 27, 1978, as Zhang Shuwu in Zhangqiu, Shandong. His father and brother are policemen and his mother is a housewife.

At the age of 12, he went to the Shaolin Temple, where he stayed for 10 years. He began to act in movies in 1997, and was cast in 2004 in the movie Kung Fu Hustle, directed by Stephen Chow.

He always plays secondary roles or little roles and he's very appreciated and solicited for his authentic kung-fu.

He got his first leading role in the film The Wrath Of Vajra.

His character dies in most of the major movies he is in.

He lives in Shenzhen, Guangdong (near Hong Kong), but he is still attached to Shaolin Temple.

He ran a Shaolin school in Shenzhen from 2000 to 2007.

Filmography

References

http://www.kungfumagazine.com/magazine/article.php?article=959

External links
 
 

Male actors from Jinan
1978 births
Living people
People's Republic of China Buddhists
Chinese male film actors
Chinese male television actors
Disciples of Shaolin Temple
Shaolin Temple